Protected areas of Indonesia comprise both terrestrial and marine environments in any of the six IUCN Protected Area categories. There are over 500 protected areas in Indonesia, of which 54 National Park are covering 16.4 million ha, and another 527 nature and game reserves cover further 28.3 million ha. The total protected land area represents over 15% of Indonesia's landmass. Marine Protected Areas comprise over 15.7 million ha representing ca. 5% of territorial waters.

History

In 1916 the colonial government of the Dutch East Indies introduced the Natural Monuments Ordinance, which led to the gazetting of 43 nature reserves in the following decade. The first two large reserves were Ujung Kulon (1921) protecting the Javan rhinoceros and Lorentz (1923) protecting indigenous tribes. In 1932 through the Ordinance on Nature reserves and Wildlife Sanctuary a new legal framework for protected areas has been established. By 1940 a network of 101 nature monuments and 35 wildlife sanctuaries has been created.

After Indonesia's independence, legislation to establish game reserves was introduced in 1967, while national parks have been first defined in 1982. During the Suharto era the extent of protected areas has been increased to cover 10% of the country's land area. In a major expansion in 2004, nine new national parks were created covering over 1,3 million ha.

National parks

There are 54 national parks in Indonesia, of which 9 are predominantly marine.
Of these 6 are World Heritage Sites, such as the Tropical Rainforest Heritage of Sumatra that includes three parks. Seven national parks are part of the World Network of Biosphere Reserves and 5 are wetlands of international importance under the Ramsar convention.

Nature reserves
Hutan Pinus/Janthoi Nature Reserve, Sumatra
Singkil Barat Nature Reserve, Sumatra
Tangkoko Batuangus Nature Reserve, Sulawesi
Ubud Monkey Forest, Bali

Marine parks

As of 2012 Indonesia had over 100 marine protected areas covering an area of 15.7 million ha, of which 32 where managed by the Ministry of Forestry while the rest where managed by local governments. In 2009 the president Susilo Bambang Yudhoyono declared a target of reaching 20 million hectares by 2020. In 2010 Indonesia also set out a longer term target to further increase the coverage of its marine protected areas to 10% of its territorial waters, or 31 million hectares.

Other protected areas
Gita Persada Butterfly Park, Sumatra

See also
Environmental issues in Indonesia
Heart of Borneo

References

External links

 
Protected areas
Indonesia
Indonesia
Protected areas